Valores (Values) is a Venezuelan cultural TV program produced from July 10, 2006, until 2008, transmitted by Vale TV, and hosted by Venezuelan writer and Literary critic Oscar Sambrano Urdaneta, the main theme of this space is the learning of Venezuelan culture in all its dimensions. Was named in memory of Venezuelan writer Arturo Uslar Pietri and his TV program Valores Humanos (Human Values).

See also 
Television in Venezuela
Culture of Venezuela
Vale TV

References

External links
 Profile of Oscar Sambrano Urdaneta at El Espectador  

Venezuelan television talk shows
2006 Venezuelan television series debuts
2008 Venezuelan television series endings
2000s Venezuelan television series